In human anatomy, the thigh is the area between the hip (pelvis) and the knee. Anatomically, it is part of the lower limb.

The single bone in the thigh is called the femur. This bone is very thick and strong (due to the high proportion of bone tissue), and forms a ball and socket joint at the hip, and a modified hinge joint at the knee.

Structure

Bones

The femur is the only bone in the thigh and serves as an attachment site for all muscles in the thigh. The head of the femur articulates with the acetabulum in the pelvic bone forming the hip joint, while the distal part of the femur articulates with the tibia and patella forming the knee. By most measures, the femur is the strongest bone in the body. The femur is also the longest bone in the body.

The femur is categorised as a long bone and comprises a diaphysis, the shaft (or body) and two epiphyses, the lower extremity and the upper extremity of femur, that articulate with adjacent bones in the hip and knee.

Muscular compartments

In cross-section, the thigh is divided up into three separate compartments, divided by fascia, each containing muscles. These compartments use the femur as an axis and are separated by tough connective tissue membranes (or septa). Each of these compartments has its own blood and nerve supply, and contains a different group of muscles.

 Medial fascial compartment of thigh, adductor
 Posterior fascial compartment of thigh, flexion, hamstring
 Anterior fascial compartment of thigh, extension

Anterior compartment muscles of the thigh include sartorius, and the four muscles that comprise the quadriceps muscles- rectus femoris, vastus medialis, vastus intermedius and vastus lateralis.

Posterior compartment muscles of the thigh are the hamstring muscles, which include semimembranosus, semitendinosus, and biceps femoris.

Medial compartment muscles are pectineus, adductor magnus, adductor longus and adductor brevis, and also gracilis.

Because the major muscles of the thigh are the largest muscles of the body, resistance exercises (strength training) of them stimulate blood flow more than any other localized activity.

Blood supply
The arterial supply is by the femoral artery and the obturator artery. The lymphatic drainage closely follows the arterial supply and drains to the lumbar lymphatic trunks on the corresponding side, which in turn drains to the cisterna chyli.

The deep venous system of the thigh consists of the femoral vein, common femoral vein, deep femoral vein, the proximal part of the popliteal vein, and various smaller vessels; these are the site of proximal deep vein thrombosis. The perforating veins connect the deep and the superficial system, which consists of the small and great saphenous veins (the site of varicose veins).

Clinical significance
Thigh weakness can result in a positive Gowers' sign on physical examination.

Regarding Sports injury,  whether acute or from overuse, a thigh injury can mean significant incapacity to perform. Soft tissue injury can encompass sprains, strains, bruising and tendinitis.

Runner's knee (Patellofemoral pain): is a direct consequence of the kneecap rubbing against the end of the thigh bone (”femur”). Tight hamstrings and weak thigh muscles, required to stabilize the knee, risk development of runner's knee.

Food
The thigh meat of some animals such as chicken, turkey and cattle is consumed as food in many parts of the world.

Society and culture
Western societies generally tolerate clothing that displays thighs, such as short shorts and miniskirts. Beachwear and many athleisure styles often display thighs as well. Professional dress codes may require covering up bare thighs.

Many Islamic countries disapprove of or prohibit the display of thighs, especially by women.

Strategic covering or display of thighs is used in popular fashion around the world, such as thigh-high boots and zettai ryoiki.

Additional images

References

Lower limb anatomy